Sukhdev Singh Dhindsa (born 9 April 1936) is a member of the Rajya Sabha. He is the President of Shiromani Akali Dal (Sanyukt), which is formed by the merger of Shiromani Akali Dal (Democratic) and Shiromani Akali Dal (Taksali) led by he and Ranjit Singh Brahampura respectively. He used to be a member of the Shiromani Akali Dal political party until tensions rose inside the SAD Political Party. He was previously a member of 14th Lok Sabha of India, representing the Sangrur constituency of Punjab. He has been awarded the Padma Bhushan in the awards list of 26 January 2019. However, he returned it in December 2020 during the farmer protests.

He was union minister of sports and chemicals and fertilisers in Third Vajpayee Ministry from 2000 to 2004. He was member of Rajya Sabha from 1998 to 2004. His son Parminder Singh Dhindsa was finance minister of Punjab.

Political career 
Dhindsa started his political journey as an active student leader during his graduation years at Govt. Ranbir College Sangrur. He was the first elected Secretary of Ranbir College Students' Council and subsequently elected as the president of council too. After graduating he was elected as the Sarpanch (youngest in whole district) of his native village Ubhawal in Sangrur district. Amongst the elected Sarpanches he became the chairman of Block Samiti Sangrur. Later he was elected as managing director of District Cooperative Bank, Sangrur. In 1972 Dhindsa won Dhanaula Assembly Constituency seat as an independent candidate and later joined Shiromani Akali Dal under the guidance and motivation of Sant Harchand Singh Longowal. He again was elected as an  MLA from Sunam on Shiromani Akali Dal ticket and inducted as Minister of State (Independent Charge) holding the portfolios of Transport, Sports, Tourism, Cultural Affairs and Civil Aviation. In 1980 he again was re elected to Punjab Vidhan Sabha from Sangrur seat. In 1985 he became MLA from Sunam. Later in 1986, differences brewed in Surjit Singh Barnala's Government on the issue of Operation Black Thunder and Dhindsa chose to go with the faction of Parkash Singh Badal in retaliation to Operation Black Thunder.

References

External links
 Members of Fourteenth Lok Sabha - Parliament of India website

Living people
1936 births
India MPs 2004–2009
People from Sangrur
Shiromani Akali Dal politicians
Rajya Sabha members from Punjab, India
National Democratic Alliance candidates in the 2014 Indian general election
Punjab, India MLAs 1977–1980
Recipients of the Padma Bhushan in public affairs